Little Wymondley is a village and former civil parish situated between Hitchin and Stevenage, now in the parish of Wymondley, in the North Hertfordshire district, in the county of Hertfordshire, England. Paradoxically, it has a larger population than its near neighbour Great Wymondley. At the 2011 Census the population of the built-up area of Little Wymondley was 995. In 1931 the parish had a population of 445.

Wymondley appears in the Domesday Book with a recorded population of 58 households.  This figure does not distinguish between Great and Little Wymondley, but scholars have been able to derive data about the separate villages from the Domesday record. Little Wymondley was a separate civil parish until 1 April 1937, when it merged with neighbouring Great Wymondley to form a single parish called Wymondley.

Little Wymondley has several interesting houses, including the moated Bury of the 16th and 17th centuries, the fine 17th century Hall, the late Georgian Wymondley House, and Wymondley Priory, an early 13th century foundation turned into a house in the 16th and 17th centuries. The Church of St Mary the Virgin, Little Wymondley, is a Grade II*  listed building.

From 1799 until 1832/33, Wymondley House at Little Wymondley was the location of a dissenting academy for the education of future nonconformist ministers. The academy went under various names, including Wymondley College.

References

External links

Wymondley Baptist Church

Villages in Hertfordshire
Former civil parishes in Hertfordshire
North Hertfordshire District